Mai Jiajian (born 19 October 1995 in Guangzhou) is a Chinese professional football player who currently plays for Chinese Super League side Guangzhou R&F as a midfielder.

Club career
In June 2014, Mai Jiajian started his professional footballer career with Shanghai Shenxin in the Chinese Super League. On 24 July 2014, Mai made his senior debut for Shanghai Shenxinin the 2014 Chinese FA Cup against Suzhou Jinfu. His Super League debut came on 30 August 2014 in a game against Tianjin Teda, coming on as a substitute for Wang Yun in the 85th minute.

On 15 July 2016, Mai was loaned to Chinese Super League side Guangzhou R&F for half season. He played for Guangzhou's reserve team in the 2016 season. He made a permanent transfer to Guangzhou R&F in 2017 and was loaned to Hong Kong Premier League side R&F, which was the satellite team of Guangzhou R&F, in March 2017. He made his debut on 1 April 2017 in a 5–0 home loss against Southern District.

Career statistics 
Statistics accurate as of match played 31 December 2020.

References

External links
 

1995 births
Living people
Chinese footballers
Footballers from Guangzhou
Shanghai Shenxin F.C. players
Guangzhou City F.C. players
R&F (Hong Kong) players
Chinese Super League players
China League One players
Association football midfielders